Mike Collings (born 29 September 1954) is a sport shooter from New Zealand.

At the 2002 Commonwealth Games in Manchester he was 21st in the full bore rifle open singles and seventh in the full bore rifle open pairs.

At the 2010 Commonwealth Games in Delhi he won a gold medal in the full bore rifle open pairs with John Snowden. He also competed in the full bore rifle open singles, finishing fourth.

Collings won the Ballinger Belt at the 1998 New Zealand rifle shooting championships. In 2009 he finished second and was top New Zealander. He won back-to-back Ballinger Belts in 2021 and 2022, becoming the first person in the history of the event, dating back to 1873, to successfully defend the trophy.

Collings is married to fellow sport shooter Diane Collings. His father, Dennis Collings, won the Ballinger Belt in 1977, and his brother, Ross Collings, did the same in 1993.

References

1954 births
Living people
Sportspeople from Lower Hutt
New Zealand male sport shooters
Commonwealth Games gold medallists for New Zealand
Shooters at the 2002 Commonwealth Games
Shooters at the 2010 Commonwealth Games
Shooters at the 2014 Commonwealth Games
Commonwealth Games medallists in shooting
Medallists at the 2010 Commonwealth Games